The Constitutional Court of the Republic of Serbia is the court authorized to perform judicial review in Serbia. It rules on whether the laws, decrees or other bills enacted by the Serbian authorities are in conformity with the Constitution. It is not considered as part of the judicial branch, but a court sui generis. The Constitutional Court is authorized by the Constitution itself and the Law on the Constitutional Court.

The seat of the Constitutional Court is in Belgrade. It consists of 15 judges, one of them being President of the Court.

History
The Constitutional Court of the Socialist Republic of Serbia (then part of SFR Yugoslavia) was established on 9 April 1963 as an independent body of the Republic and designated to protect constitutionality and legality in accordance with the Constitution and within the framework of the rights and duties proscribed by the 1963 Constitution of SR Serbia. The Constitutional Law of Serbia, enacted on 25 December 1963, defined jurisdiction and adjudications before the Constitutional Court and legal effects of its decisions in a more specific manner.

The Constitutional Court of Serbia commenced its work on 15 February 1964. The Constitutional Court has upon proclamation of the 1990 Constitution of Serbia acted within the framework of absence of division of powers, where the Parliament was the highest body of state power. The Constitutional Court has through its presence and work contributed to the importance and contribution in preservation of the constitutional principles and legality.

Composition
The Constitutional Court consists of 15 judges. Five of them are elected by the President of Serbia, five by the National Assembly, and five are elected at the General Session of the Supreme Court of Cassation. Judges are elected to the 9-year term. The candidates have to be accomplished lawyers of at least 40 years of age and with at least 15 years of experience in jurisprudence. One person can be elected to the Court a maximum of two times. After the election, the judges take oath before the President of the National Assembly.

The term of the Constitutional Court judge ends after 9 years since the election, or by resignation, by retirement or by impeachment. A Constitutional Court judge may not perform any other public office or any other job at all, except for being a professor at the Law School of one of the universities in Serbia. A Constitutional Court judge enjoys immunity from prosecution.

Composition  (year of election given in the parenthesis):
 Snežana Marković (2016), President since 2020
Gordana Ajnšpiler Popović (2019)
Lidija Đukić (2019)
Tatjana Đurkić (nee Babić) (2016)
 Dragana Kolarić (2016)
 Tamaš Korhec (2016)
Vesna Ilić Prelić (2007)
 Miroslav Nikolić (2016)
Vladan Petrov (2019)
Nataša Plavšić (2019)
 Jovan Ćirić (2016)
 Milan Škulić (2016), Deputy President since 2020
 Tijana Šurlan (2016)
Two seats are currently vacant, .

Presidents of the Constitutional Court
Sources: 

 Status

Library of the Constitutional Court
The Library of the Constitutional Court was formed after the Court had been established. According to the profile of its collections, the Library of the Constitutional Court is a specialized law library. The library is in charge of collecting, storing, cataloguing, and circulating literature from different branches of law, with special regard to constitutional legislation. The Library is in possession of a large collection of monographs, serial publications, and collections of papers. In addition, it has an electronic database of legal acts.

The Constitutional Court Library owns a valuable collection of legal acts issued in the late 19th and early 20th centuries. The Library cooperates with the head office of Belgrade City Library, National Library of Serbia and other libraries of similar profile.

Notes

See also
Supreme Court
Constitutionalism

References
This article incorporates text from the Constitutional Court of Serbia official site, which is in the public domain, because it is a law, decree, regulation or official material of a Republic of Serbia state body or a body performing public functions, under the terms of Article 6, Paragraph 2 of Serbian copyright law.  See Copyright.

External links
 Constitutional Court of Serbia Official page 

Law of Serbia
Serbia
Courts and tribunals established in 1963